Pig wings are a pork product made from the fibula of a pig's shank - a single bone surrounded by lean, tender meat.

References

Pork dishes